Tôt ou Tard (stylized as tôt Ou tard) is an independent French record label. It was founded in 1996 as a break-off from Warner Music Group, and turned independent in 2002. The name of the label can be translated as "Sooner or later" in French. Vincent Frèrebeau heads the label, which has about thirty bands and artists signed to it (in 2005).  In 2011, Wagram Music acquired a stake in the label and became its exclusive distributor. In September 2018, Wagram Music sold a 49% stake in Tôt ou Tard to Believe Digital.

Artists signed

 Adé
 Constance Amiot
 Dick Annegarn
 François Audrain
 Mathieu Boogaerts
 Françoiz Breut
 Cats on Trees
 Da Silva
 Vincent Delerm
 Fabulous Trobadors
 Piers Faccini
 Mohamed Fellag
 Thomas Fersen
 Ben Howard
 Agnès Jaoui
 Seun Kuti
 Lisa LeBlanc
 Luce
 Fabrice Luchini
 Franck Monnet
 Erza Muqoli
 Yael Naim
 Shaka Ponk
 Roseaux
 Albin de la Simone
 Têtes Raides
 Vianney
 Peter von Poehl
 Patrick Watson
 Wave Machines

Former artists

 Stanley Beckford
 Jeanne Cherhal
 Jacques Higelin
 Lhasa de Sela
 Pierre Perret
 Gianmaria Testa
 Venus

See also
 List of record labels

References

External links
Official site

French independent record labels
Record labels established in 1996
Pop record labels